The Slothouber–Graatsma puzzle is a packing problem that calls for packing six 1 × 2 × 2 blocks and three 1 × 1 × 1 blocks into a 3 × 3 × 3 box. The solution to this puzzle is unique (up to mirror reflections and rotations). It was named after its inventors Jan Slothouber and William Graatsma.

The puzzle is essentially the same if the three 1 × 1 × 1 blocks are left out, so that the task is to pack six 1 × 2 × 2 blocks into a cubic box with volume 27.

Solution

The solution of the Slothouber–Graatsma puzzle is straightforward when one realizes that the three 1 × 1 × 1 blocks (or the three holes) need to be placed along a body diagonal of the box, as each of the 3 x 3 layers in the various directions needs to contain such a unit block. This follows from parity considerations, because the larger blocks can only fill an even number of the 9 cells in each 3 x 3 layer.

Variations
The Slothouber–Graatsma puzzle is an example of a cube-packing puzzle using convex polycubes. More general puzzles involving the packing of convex rectangular blocks exist. The best known example is the Conway puzzle which asks for the packing of eighteen convex rectangular blocks into a 5 x 5 x 5 box. A harder convex rectangular block packing problem is to pack forty-one 1 x 2 x 4 blocks into a 7 x 7 x 7 box (thereby leaving 15 holes); the solution is analogous to the 5x5x5 case, and has three 1x1x5 cuboidal holes in mutually perpendicular directions covering all 7 slices.

See also
Soma cube
Bedlam cube
Diabolical cube

References

External links
The Slothouber-Graatsma puzzle in Stewart Coffin's "The Puzzling World of Polyhedral Dissections"
Jan Slothouber and William Graatsma: Cubic constructs
 William Graatsma and Jan Slothouber: Dutch mathematical art

Packing problems
Recreational mathematics
Tiling puzzles
Mechanical puzzle cubes